François Ondet (2 December 1902 – 2 August 1968) was a French racing cyclist. He rode in the 1929 Tour de France.

He also rode in the 1930 Tour de France.

References

1902 births
1968 deaths
French male cyclists
Place of birth missing